Christine Cicot (born 10 September 1964 in Libourne, Gironde) is a French judoka, Olympic medalist and world champion. She received a bronze medal in the heavyweight (+72 kg) division at the 1996 Summer Olympics in Atlanta. She became world champion in Paris 1997.

References

External links
 

1964 births
Living people
People from Libourne
French female judoka
Olympic judoka of France
Judoka at the 1996 Summer Olympics
Judoka at the 2000 Summer Olympics
Olympic bronze medalists for France
Olympic medalists in judo
Medalists at the 1996 Summer Olympics
Sportspeople from Gironde
20th-century French women
21st-century French women